Compsodrillia canna, common name the reed turrid, is a species of sea snail, a marine gastropod mollusc in the family Pseudomelatomidae, the turrids and allies.

Description
The length of the shell varies between 5.5 mm and 20 mm.

(Original description) Compared to Compsodrillia eucosmia, the shell is smaller and more slender. The peripheral primary spirals number always three. The secondary spirals are few or obsolete. The  ribs number six or seven and are rather more prominent.§

Distribution
C. canna can be found in Atlantic waters, ranging from the coast of North Carolina to the Lesser Antilles.

References

External links
 
  Rosenberg, G.; Moretzsohn, F.; García, E. F. (2009). Gastropoda (Mollusca) of the Gulf of Mexico, Pp. 579–699 in: Felder, D.L. and D.K. Camp (eds.), Gulf of Mexico–Origins, Waters, and Biota. Texas A&M Press, College Station, Texas
 

canna
Gastropods described in 1889